Armée Patriotique Rwandaise Football Club (APR FC or APR) is a football club from Kigali in Rwanda. The club plays their home games at Amahoro Stadium. The club was founded in June 1993 as the team of the Rwandese Patriotic Front.

History 
Despite their short history, they become one of the most successful club in the Rwandan football league winning seventeen Rwandan league titles and seven Rwandan Cups. APR FC also won the CECAFA Clubs Cup in 2004, 2007 and 2010 after ending up as losing finalists in that competition in 1996 and 2000.

In 2022, the club reached the Second Round of the CAF Champions League for the first time in club history.

Honours

Domestic competitions
 Rwandan Premier League: 20
 1995, 1996, 1999, 2000, 2001, 2003, 2005, 2006, 2007, 2009, 2010, 2011, 2012, 2014, 2015, 2016, 2018, 2020, 2021, 2022.

 Rwandan Cup: 13
 1994, 1996, 1999, 2000, 2002, 2006, 2007, 2008, 2010, 2011, 2012, 2014, 2017.

Rwandan Super Cup: 3
 2002, 2016, 2018.

International
 Kagame Interclub Cup: 3
 2004, 2007, 2010.

Performance in CAF competitions
 CAF Champions League: 17 appearances

1997 – First Round
2000 – withdrew in First Round
2002 – First Round
2004 – Third Round
2006 – First Round
2007 – First Round

2008 – Preliminary Round
2010 – First Round
2011 – Preliminary Round
2012 – First Round
2013 –  Preliminary Round
2015 –  First Round

2016 –  First Round
2017 –  Preliminary Round
2019 – Preliminary Round
2021 – Preliminary Round
2022 – Second Round

 African Cup of Champions Clubs: 1 appearance
1996 – Second Round

 CAF Confederation Cup: 3 appearances
2004 – Intermediate Round
2005 – Second Round
2009 – First Round

 CAF Cup Winners' Cup: 1 appearance
2003 – Semi-finals

 CAF Cup: 2 appearances
1998 – First Round
1999 – First Round

Staff

Management

Club Hononary President
 Gen. James Kabarebe

Club President
 Lt Gen. Mubarakh Muganga

Vice Club Chairman and Club Information Manager 
 Brg.Gen. Bayingana Firmin

General Secretary
 Masabo Michel

Public Relations & IT Manager
 Tony Kabanda

Head Coach
 Mohammed Adil Erradi 

Asst. Coach/ Fitness coach
 Jamel Eddine Neffati

GOAL KEEPING COACH
 Mugabo Alex

References

External links
 Official website

APR F.C.
Sport in Kigali
Football clubs in Rwanda
Association football clubs established in 1993
1993 establishments in Rwanda
Military association football clubs